The following is a list of the mountains in the Altai range.

 
Altai